Designers' Challenge is a show that aired on HGTV in the United States.  In each episode, three interior designers make presentations to a homeowner, who chooses one design to use in the house. It was hosted by Chris Harrison.

Landscapers' Challenge was a spin-off that dealt with outdoor landscaping instead.

References

HGTV original programming